Groomed is an 2021 American documentary film, directed and produced by Gwen van de Pas. Jason Blum serves as a producer under his Blumhouse Productions banner. It follows Van de Pas as she returns to her hometown in search of answers of the man who sexually abused her as a child and to understand more about grooming.

The film was released on March 18, 2021, by Discovery+.

Synopsis
Gwen van de Pas returns to her home town in search of answers of the man who sexually abused her as a child, to understand more about grooming.

Production
Gwen van De Pas left her job as a consultant in San Francisco to begin a documentary about sexual assault which occurred in her childhood while she was on a swim team. van de Pas spoke with multiple victims of assault and grooming with some appearing in the film to understand the process better and to feel less alone in the experience. In February 2021, it was announced Discovery+ would distribute the film, with Jason Blum serving as a producer on the film, under his Blumhouse Productions banner.

Release
The film was released on March 18, 2021, by Discovery+.

References

External links
 
 

2021 films
2021 documentary films
American documentary films
Films produced by Jason Blum
Blumhouse Productions films
Films about sexual abuse
Documentary films about violence against women
2020s English-language films
2020s American films